Paul Donnelly may refer to:Athlone 
Owner of PD Autos 
Net worth 2.5 million 
Athlone Musical Society 
Boxing (Roscommon Club)
St Domnics gaa
5 all Ireland table tennis titles 

Paul Donnelly (footballer) (born 1981), English association football player
Paul Donnelly (politician), Irish Sinn Féin politician for Dublin West
Paul C. Donnelly (1923–2014), American NASA official